The 2016 Puerto Rico primaries may refer to:

 2016 United States presidential primaries in Puerto Rico
 2016 Puerto Rico Democratic primary
 2016 Puerto Rico Republican primary

 Territorial government primaries 
 2016 New Progressive Party of Puerto Rico primaries
 2016 Popular Democratic Party of Puerto Rico primaries

Primary elections in Puerto Rico